Gregory S. Clark is an Australian businessman, He founded the computer company Dascom, later to become part of Tivoli Software. He was the CEO of Symantec.

Clark graduated from Griffith University in Brisbane, Australia, where he obtained a BSc.

Business background  
Clark started a computer company called Dascom with labs on the Gold Coast of Queensland and Santa Cruz, California. In 1999, Dascom was acquired by IBM's Tivoli Software division.

Clark has been subsequently associated with the following companies:
 IBM Tivoli
 E2open, Inc.
 Mincom
 Blue Coat, Inc.
 Blue Coat Systems Inc
 Anonyome Labs Inc
Emulex
Global Healthcare Exchange
Imperva
Inteligreated
Aconex
 Symantec
He was the CEO of Symantec until May 9, 2019.

Published works 
He is the co-author of Security intelligence: a practitioner's guide to solving enterprise security challenges (2015).

References

1965 births
Living people
Griffith University alumni
University of New Mexico alumni
Gen Digital people